Saint-Orens-de-Gameville, also referred to as Saint-Orens, is a commune in the Haute-Garonne department, administrative region of Occitania, southwestern France.

Population

The inhabitants of the commune are known as Saint-Orennais.

See also
Communes of the Haute-Garonne department

References

Communes of Haute-Garonne